This is a list of the Malaysian federal electoral districts used since 1955 (Trengganu and Johore since 1954).

Perlis

Kedah

Kelantan

Terengganu
Formerly spelled as Trengganu

Penang
Formerly known as Penang Settlement

Perak

Pahang

Selangor

Federal Territories

Negeri Sembilan
Formerly spelled as Negri Sembilan

Malacca
Formerly known as Malacca Settlement

Johor
Formerly spelled as Johore

Sabah

Sarawak

Elections in Malaysia
Lists of former constituencies
 
Malaysia politics-related lists